The 2016–17 season was the 134th season in Bristol Rovers' history and their 89th in the English Football League. Following back-to-back promotions in 2014–15 and 2015–16, Rovers competed in the third tier of English football, League One. What was a steady season, Rovers played the likes of Coventry and Chelsea (in the EFL Cup) for the first time in decades. After a brief playoff push towards the end of the season, Rovers finished in a respectable 10th place with 66 points, their highest finish in the football league since the 1999–2000 season.

Season events

Pre-season
Rovers manager Darrell Clarke was quick to make good on his promise to offer all out-of-contract senior players new contracts if the club was promoted, confirming that, with the exception of Rory Fallon, new deals were "in the post" just five days after the previous season had concluded. In addition to Lee Brown and Tom Lockyer, whose deals were signed before the season had ended, goalkeeper Steve Mildenhall and midfielder Jay Malpas were the first to sign a new deals on 17 May. Toward the end of May, Clarke himself had agreed a new three-year contract, making him the highest paid manager in the club's history. This came after the club received a formal approach from Championship side Leeds United which Rovers rejected.

June saw defender Daniel Leadbitter and winger Billy Bodin sign new two-year contracts at Rovers. Goalkeeper Will Puddy, defenders James Clarke and Mark McChrystal, midfielders Lee Mansell Cristian Montaño, Jake Gosling, Ollie Clarke and Chris Lines and forward Ellis Harrison also agreed a new deals of undisclosed duration. Tom Parkes meanwhile rejected the offer of a new deal and instead joined League Two side Leyton Orient. On 16 June, defender Peter Hartley became the club's first signing of the season on a free transfer from Plymouth Argyle followed a day later by the signing of winger Byron Moore from Port Vale.

Peterborough United forward Luke James became July's first signing, on a season long loan. Rovers' top goalscorer of the previous two seasons, Matty Taylor, signed a new contract in July, ending speculation linking him with a move away.

First team

Transfers

In

Loans in

Out

Loans out

Squad statistics
Source:

Numbers in parentheses denote appearances as substitute.
Players with squad numbers struck through and marked  left the club during the playing season.
Players with names in italics and marked * were on loan from another club for the whole of their season with Bristol Rovers.
Players listed with no appearances have been in the matchday squad but only as unused substitutes.
Key to positions: GK – Goalkeeper; DF – Defender; MF – Midfielder; FW – Forward

Competitions

Pre-season friendlies
On 23 November 2015, Rovers first pre-season fixture was announced. As part of a week-long training camp in Spain, Rovers will play CE Sabadell with whom the club have a connection due to both playing in blue and white quartered shirts. Further fixtures were announced once the previous season had concluded, with Rovers due to play Salisbury, Bath City, Mangotsfield United, Weston-super-Mare and Exeter City, all away, and Cheltenham Town, Swansea City and Aston Villa at home.

League One

On 22 June 2016, the EFL announced the fixtures for the forthcoming season. Rovers started the season away to Scunthorpe United on 6 August, followed by their first home fixture on 14 August against fellow promoted side Oxford United. The traditional boxing day fixture sees Rovers host Coventry City while the season will end with Millwall travelling to the Memorial Stadium.

League table

Results summary

Results by round

Matches

FA Cup

EFL Cup

On 22 June 2016, the first round draw for the EFL Cup was made. Rovers were drawn at home to Championship side Cardiff City, managed by former Rovers boss Paul Trollope. The game was later picked for live broadcast by Sky Sports. Rovers progressed to the second round thanks to a 115th-minute winner from Chris Lines to set up a trip to Premier League side Chelsea.

EFL Trophy

On 27 July 2016, the group stage draw for the EFL Trophy was made. Rovers were drawn in Southern Group A along with Reading Academy, Portsmouth and Yeovil Town.

See also
2016–17 in English football
2016–17 Football League One
List of Bristol Rovers F.C. seasons

References

External links
 Bristol Rovers F.C.
 Bristol Post
 BBC Sport
 Sky Sports
 Soccerbase: ResultsStatsTransfers

Bristol Rovers
Bristol Rovers F.C. seasons